Manuel Díaz Rodríguez (28 February 1871 – 24 August 1927), was a Venezuelan writer, journalist, physician, diplomat and politician. He is considered one of the greatest representatives of the Hispanic modernismo movement.

Life 
He was born in Chacao, Miranda state. He served as director of Higher Education and Fine Arts at the Ministry of Education in 1911, Minister of Foreign Affairs between 1913 and 1914, Senator for the Bolívar state in 1915, Minister of Development in 1916, Minister Plenipotentiary of Venezuela in Italy from 1919 until 1923, Head of Government of the states Nueva Esparta (1925) and Sucre (1926). He became a member of the National Academy of History in 1926. He died in New York City, where he had traveled for treatment of a throat ailment, in 1927.

Bibliography 
Sensaciones de Viajes(1896)
Confesiones de Psiquis (1897)
De mis romerías (1898)
Cuentos de Color (1899)
Ídolos rotos (1901)
Sangre Patricia (1902)
Camino de Perfección (1910)
Sermones líricos(1918)
Peregrina o el Pozo encantado (1922)

See also 
Literature of Venezuela
List of Venezuelan writers 
List of Ministers of Foreign Affairs of Venezuela

References 
 Biography at Venezuelatuya.com
 Biography of the Mayorship of Chacao
 Biography by Pedro Díaz Seijas

  

1871 births
1927 deaths
People from Miranda (state)
Venezuelan people of Spanish descent
Venezuelan people of Canarian descent
Venezuelan novelists
Venezuelan male writers
Male novelists
Venezuelan journalists
Venezuelan diplomats
19th-century Venezuelan physicians
Venezuelan Ministers of Foreign Affairs
Central University of Venezuela alumni
Modernismo
Members of the Senate of Venezuela
Government ministers of Venezuela
Planning ministers of Venezuela